The men's tournament of the 2018 Canadian U18 Curling Championships was held from April 9 to 14 at the W.C. O'Neill Arena Complex and Heather Curling Club in Saint Andrews, New Brunswick.

Teams
The teams are listed as follows:

Round-robin standings

Final round-robin standings

Round-robin results
All draw times are listed in Atlantic Time (UTC−04:00).

Pool A

Draw 1
Tuesday, April 9, 6:00 pm

Draw 2
Wednesday, April 10, 10:00 am

Draw 3
Wednesday, April 10, 2:00 pm

Draw 4
Wednesday, April 10, 6:00 pm

Draw 6
Thursday, April 11, 2:00 pm

Draw 7
Thursday, April 11, 6:00 pm

Draw 9
Friday, April 12, 2:00 pm

Draw 10
Friday, April 12, 6:00 pm

Pool B

Draw 1
Tuesday, April 9, 6:00 pm

Draw 2
Wednesday, April 10, 10:00 am

Draw 3
Wednesday, April 10, 2:00 pm

Draw 4
Wednesday, April 10, 6:00 pm

Draw 5
Thursday, April 11, 10:00 am

Draw 6
Thursday, April 11, 2:00 pm

Draw 7
Thursday, April 11, 6:00 pm

Draw 8
Friday, April 12, 10:00 am

Draw 9
Friday, April 12, 2:00 pm

Draw 10
Friday, April 12, 6:00 pm

Knockout round

Source:

A Bracket

A Semifinals
Saturday, April 13, 9:00 am

A Finals
Saturday, April 13, 4:00 pm

B Bracket

B Semifinals
Saturday, April 13, 4:00 pm

B Finals
Sunday, April 14, 9:00 am

Playoffs

Semifinals
Sunday, April 14, 1:30 pm

Bronze medal game
Sunday, April 14, 6:00 pm

Final
Sunday, April 14, 6:00 pm

References

External links
Official Website 

U18 Championships
Canadian U18 Curling Championships, 2018
Canadian U18 Curling Championships
Canadian U18 Curling
April 2018 sports events in Canada
Saint Andrews, New Brunswick